Terry Rumbel (born 24 July 1951) is an Australian former sports shooter. He competed at the 1984 Summer Olympics.

References

1951 births
Living people
Australian male sport shooters
Olympic shooters of Australia
Shooters at the 1984 Summer Olympics
Shooters at the 1978 Commonwealth Games
Shooters at the 1982 Commonwealth Games
Shooters at the 1986 Commonwealth Games
Place of birth missing (living people)
Commonwealth Games medallists in shooting
Commonwealth Games gold medallists for Australia
Commonwealth Games silver medallists for Australia
Commonwealth Games bronze medallists for Australia
20th-century Australian people
Medallists at the 1978 Commonwealth Games
Medallists at the 1982 Commonwealth Games
Medallists at the 1986 Commonwealth Games